The Peruvian antpitta (Grallaricula peruviana) is a species of bird in the family Grallariidae. It is found in Ecuador and northern Peru.

Its natural habitat is subtropical or tropical moist montane forest. It is threatened by habitat loss.

References

Peruvian antpitta
Birds of the Ecuadorian Andes
Birds of the Peruvian Andes
Peruvian antpitta
Taxonomy articles created by Polbot